Sergei Inalovich Gazdanov (21 August 1969 – 2000) was a Russian professional footballer. He made his professional debut in the Soviet First League in 1986 for FC Spartak Ordzhonikidze. He played 2 games in the UEFA Cup 1993–94 for FC Spartak Vladikavkaz.

Honours
 Russian Premier League runner-up: 1992.

References

1969 births
Sportspeople from Vladikavkaz
2000 deaths
Soviet footballers
Association football midfielders
Association football defenders
Russian footballers
FC Spartak Vladikavkaz players
Russian Premier League players
FC Elista players
PFC Spartak Nalchik players